"Rebel Music" is a song by American rapper MC Ren, released on March 27, 2014, as the lead single from his upcoming EP Rebel Music.

Background 
Having announced that he was working on his fifth studio album, MC Ren immediately reached out to E-A-Ski for production. The two begun collaborating and MC Ren announced that E-A-Ski was going to produce the whole album, including the single. After talking about it for weeks, the single was eventually released on March 27, 2014.

To promote the single MC Ren appeared on several radio shows and did a handful of interviews with magazines and newspapers. Before releasing the single on iTunes, he released it on hiphop magazine DubCNN to give the song a buzz.

The single was met with mostly positive review from both fans and critics. It also received some airplay on many radio stations, including some mainstream airplay.

Track listing

Release history

References 

2014 singles
2014 songs
MC Ren songs
Gangsta rap songs
Songs written by MC Ren
Songs written by Ice Cube